Abdullahi Bala (born 1967) is a Nigerian academic, author and professor of soil science. He was vice-chancellor of the Federal University of Technology in Minna from 2017 to 2022.

Bala was born at Suleja, in Niger State. He obtained a Bachelor of Science from Ahmadu Bello University; a Master's Degree in soil  chemistry at the University of Reading, and Doctorate in soil microbiology from Wye College.

Prior to being appointed vice chancellor he worked at the Independent Policy Group, Abuja; International Institute of Tropical Agriculture, Kano, and as Deputy Vice-Chancellor Academics at the Federal University of Technology.

References

living people
1967 births
Vice-Chancellors of Federal University of Technology, Minna
Alumni of Wye College